In behaviorism, rate of reinforcement is number of reinforcements per time, usually per minute. Symbol of this rate is usually Rf. Its first major exponent was B.F. Skinner (1939). It is used in the Matching Law.

Rf = # of reinforcements/unit of time = SR+/t

See also
 Rate of response

References
  Herrnstein, R.J. (1961). Relative and absolute strength of responses as a function of frequency of reinforcement. Journal of the Experimental Analysis of Behaviour, 4, 267–272. 
  Herrnstein, R.J. (1970). On the law of effect. Journal of the Experimental Analysis of Behavior, 13, 243–266.
  Skinner, B.F. (1938). The behavior of organisms: An experimental analysis. , .

Behaviorism
Quantitative analysis of behavior
Reinforcement